Seo In-seok (born February 22, 1949) is a South Korean actor. Seo made his acting debut in 1976, and among his notable television series are the historical dramas Emperor Wang Gun (2000) and Jeong Do-jeon (2014).

Filmography

Television series

Film

Theater

Awards and nominations

References

External links 
 
 
 
 

1949 births
Living people
South Korean male television actors
South Korean male film actors
South Korean male stage actors
People from Seoul